Barry John Hugman (born 1941) is an English sports author, statistician and historian. He was born in Hampstead Garden Suburb, Middlesex, in 1941 and educated at Clarks College, Finchley. Having spent ten years concentrating on a business career he decided to produce what was called at the time the biggest job in football statistics–collating and presenting the records of all men who had played in the Football League since 1946. He has since gone on to publish many other works, a large number of which are recognised by the authorities as definitive sources in their field.

He also helped to devise and set up the British Boxing Board of Control British Boxing Awards, which started in 1984, and launched the Boxing Monthly magazine in 1989. In 2011 he received the British Boxing Board of Control Exceptional Award for services to the sport of British professional boxing.

Football publications
 Football League Players’ Records, 1946-1981. Now called PFA Premier & Football League Players’ Records, there have been six further editions: 1984, 1988, 1992, 1998, 2005 and 2015
 Hugman’s Football Annual. Formerly the Football League Year, there were two editions, 1989 and 1990
 The Official Football League Yearbook. First published in 1991, there was a further edition in 1992
 Premier League: The Players. First published in 1992, there was a further edition in 1993
 Footballers’ Who’s Who in association with the Professional Footballers' Association. Launched in 1995 as the PFA Footballers’ Factfile, there were 15 further editions

Boxing publications
 The George Wimpey Amateur Boxing Association Yearbook 1982

 BBBofC British Boxing Yearbook Published annually from 1984 to 2010- 26 editions
 Hugman's International Boxing Year, published in 1988,1989 and 1990
 The Definitive History of World Championship Boxing, Mini Fly to Bantam, 1870 to October 2016
 The Definitive History of World Championship Boxing, Junior Feather to Light, 1870 to October 2016
 The Definitive History of World Championship Boxing, Junior Welter to Middle, 1870 to October 2016
 The Definitive History of World Championship Boxing, Super Middle to Heavy, 1870 to October 2016
 The Definitive History of World Championship Boxing, Mini Fly to Junior Feather, 1870 to December 2018 2nd Edition
 The Definitive History of World Championship Boxing, Feather to Welter, 1870 to December 2018 2nd Edition
 The Definitive History of World Championship Boxing, Junior Middle to Heavy, 1870 to December 2018 2nd Edition
 The Definitive History of World Championship Boxing, Mini Fly to Junior Feather, 1870 to December 2020 3rd Edition
 The Definitive History of World Championship Boxing, Feather to Welter, 1870 to December 2020 3rd Edition
 The Definitive History of World Championship Boxing, Junior Middle to Heavy, 1870 to December 2020 3rd Edition
 Lineal World Boxing Champions

Other sporting publications
 The Sporting Life Jockeyform: Flat Racing, 1987
 The Olympic Games: Complete Track & Field Results, 1896-1988
 Hugman’s Amateur Swimming Association Yearbook, 1990

References

External links 
 Barry Hugman's Footballers
 Barry Hugman's World Championship Boxing
 The Definitive History of World Championship Boxing 1st Edition book review from The Ring magazine

1941 births
Living people
Writers from London
English sportswriters
English statisticians
Boxing writers